Salem or Salim  is an Arab village in Israel's Haifa District. The village is in the Wadi Ara area of the northern Triangle, 4 kilometers northeast of Umm al-Fahm. Since 1996, it has been under the jurisdiction of the Ma'ale Iron local council. In mid-2016 Salem's population was 1,699, predominantly Muslims. The village is divided into five neighborhoods: Abu Bakr, Darwish, Subaihat, Ayash and Rifai. Most of the adult males in the village work in manual labour.

History
Pottery remains from the  Iron Age I, IA II, Persian and the  Hellenistic era have been found, and a rock-hewn installation has been excavated from the latter period.

Pottery and coins have been also been found from the Roman period, in addition to pottery from the Byzantine, early Islamic and  Mamluk period.

Ottoman era
It had a population of 9 households, all Muslim. It paid a fixed tax of 25% on agricultural products, including wheat, barley, olive trees, goats and beehives, in addition to occasional revenues; the taxes totalled 4,300 akçe.

French traveler Victor Guérin visited in 1870 and noted that "There are now not more than 150 residents, and it sits on a hill from which the view encompasses a considerable part of the Jezreel Valley."  He further noted that there were "distinct traces" of ancient buildings.

In 1882, the Palestine Exploration Fund's Survey of Western Palestine described Salem as a "small village standing above the road, with a well on the north".

British Mandate era
In the 1922 census the population of the village was 44, all Muslim. Both in the 1931 census  and in the 1945 statistics the population was counted with that of Rummanah.

1948 war
During the 1948 Arab-Israeli War the village and the surrounding area came under Iraqi control. In March 1949 Jordanian forces replaced the Iraqi forces in Wadi Ara. On 3 April 1949 Israel and Jordan signed an armistice agreement in which Israel would receive the Wadi Ara area. During the war, 15 refugee families settled in the village.

State of Israel

In November 1954, a Jordanian force entered the village and attacked a squad of Magav policemen, wounding one. The incident caused outrage because the villagers did not report that the village was captured and did not oppose the force, allowing it to attack Israeli security personal. The villagers said they were in their homes and didn't see anything. The villagers had strong relations with the nearby Palestinian village of Rummanah, as two of Salem's clans originated in Rummanah. In the 1950s there was constant smuggling between the two villages.

In the late 1950s, the Jewish kibbutz of Giv'at Oz established good relations with Salem as well as nearby Zalafa when a Kupat Holim clinic was built in the kibbutz which served the residents of Salem. Later the kibbutz provided water and transportation services to Salem and social contact was built up between both communities as the residents started learning Hebrew. The villagers started reporting the Israeli authorities about attacks coming from Jordan.

Salem is one of the villages of Wadi Ara that lacked municipal status after the establishment of Israel. and was under the administration of mukhtars (village headmen) who were appointed by the Interior Ministry. and salem's muckhtar was named Taleb Abu Bakr These mukhtars administrated the village until 1992, when the Interior Ministry established the Nahal Iron regional council, uniting it with seven other Arab villages. Salem was one of the two villages that cooperated with the council, while the other villages objected to the administrative arrangement and sought independent municipal status for each village. During this period most of the existing roads in Salem were paved. To allay local concerns in other villages, the Interior Ministry established an investigative committee to examine other options, and in 1996, decided to split the regional council into two local councils, one of them is Ma'ale Iron, which includes Salem and the other one is Basma. Since 2010 the Ma'ale Iron municipality building is located in the village

Demographics

Population
According to the 2008 census of the Central Bureau of Statistics (CBS), Salem had 1,600 residents, 99.9% of them Muslim. 49.8% were under age 17, 48.1% were aged 18–64, and 2.1% were over 65. The median age was 18.

Labour
According to the 2008 CBS census, 32.5% of residents were in the annual civilian labour force; 60.4% of the men; 0.9% of the women. 49.3% of the male workforce worked in construction; 9.8% in wholesale, retail trade, and Auto Mechanism; 8.8% in manufacturing; and the rest in other sectors. 100% of the female workforce worked in education.

Clans
Salem is divided into two parts. The western part is inhabited by members of the Abu Bakr clan which originated in Ya'bad; in 2001 this clan numbered 3,500, of which 3,000 lived in the West Bank and 500 lived in Israel–300 in Salem and 200 in nearby Zalafa. The eastern part is inhabited by members of the Araf'aiya and Subaihat clans, as well as some other clans.

See also
Arab localities in Israel

References

Bibliography

External links
 Welcome To Salim
Survey of Western Palestine, Map 8:    IAA, Wikimedia commons 

Arab localities in Israel
Triangle (Israel)
Wadi Ara